Jada Hart and Ena Shibahara were the defending champions, but both players were ineligible to participate.

Olga Danilović and Marta Kostyuk won the title, defeating Lea Bošković and Wang Xiyu in the final, 6–1, 7–5.

Seeds

Draw

Finals

Top half

Bottom half

External links 
 Main draw

Girls' Doubles
US Open, 2017 Girls' Doubles